The 2003 Men's Ice Hockey World Championships was the 67th such event sanctioned by the International Ice Hockey Federation (IIHF). The competition also served as qualification for division placements in the 2004 competition. Canada won the gold medal, beating Sweden 3–2 in the final.

Championship 

Final standings
 
 
 
 
 
 
 
 
 
 
 
 
 
  — relegated to Division I for 2004
  — relegated to Division I for 2004

Division I

Group A
Played at Budapest, Hungary April 15–21

Group B
Played at Zagreb, Croatia April 13–20

Division II

Group A
Played at Seoul, South Korea, April 5–12

Group B
Played at Sofia, Bulgaria, March 24–30

Division III
Played at Auckland, New Zealand April 3–6

See also
To celebrate the games, the Finnish government issued a high value commemorative coin: the 2003 Ice Hockey World Championships commemorative coin, with three ice hockey sticks and a puck engraved on the reverse.

References

External links

 IIHF Website
 Complete results at Passionhockey.com
 

World Ice Hockey Championships - Men's
IIHF Men's World Ice Hockey Championships